This is a list of international presidential trips made by François Hollande, the 24th President of France. During his presidency, which began with his inauguration on 15 May 2012 and ended with the inauguration of Emmanuel Macron on 14 May 2017, François Hollande made 183 presidential trips to 83 states internationally. The number of visits per country where he travelled are:
 One visit to Afghanistan, Angola, Argentina, Belarus, Benin, Cameroon, Canada, Chad, Chile, Colombia, Comoros, Cuba, Cyprus, Czech Republic, Democratic Republic of the Congo, Ethiopia, Georgia, Guinea, Haiti, Iceland, Indonesia, Ireland, Ivory Coast (Côte d'Ivoire), Kazakhstan, Laos, Latvia, Lithuania, Luxembourg, Madagascar, Malaysia, Monaco, Niger, Norway, Palestine, Peru, Philippines, Romania, Singapore, Slovenia, South Korea, Turkey, Ukraine, Uruguay and Vietnam.
 Two visits to Algeria, Armenia, Australia, Azerbaijan, Egypt, India, Iraq, Israel, Japan, Jordan, Lebanon, Mexico, Netherlands, Nigeria, Portugal, Qatar, Senegal, South Africa, United Arab Emirates and Vatican City.
 Three visits to Brazil, the Central African Republic, China, Greece, Mali, Morocco, Slovakia and Tunisia.
 Four visits to Malta and Switzerland.
 Five visits to Russia, Spain and Saudi Arabia.
 Six visits to Poland.
 Seven visits to the United Kingdom.
 Eight visits to Italy.
 Ten visits to the United States.
 Twenty-two visits to Germany.
 Forty-two visits to Belgium.

2012 
In his first year in office, President François Hollande made 25 international trips to 18 different countries. The following were the international trips made by the President in 2012:

2013 
In 2013, President François Hollande made 34 international trips to 28 different countries. The following were the international trips made by President Hollande during the year:

2014 

In 2014, President François Hollande made 30 international trips to 27 different countries. The following were the international trips made by President Hollande during the year:

2015 

In 2015, President François Hollande made 45 international trips to 34 different countries. The following were the international trips made by President Hollande during the year:

2016 

In 2016, President François Hollande made 37 international trips to 30 different countries. The following were the international trips already made by President Hollande during the year:

2017
In 2017, President François Hollande made thirteen international trips to thirteen different countries. The following are the trips made by President Hollande in 2017:

Multilateral meetings

See also
 Foreign relations of France

References

Presidential trips
Lists of diplomatic trips
Hollande
Lists of 21st-century trips
Lists of diplomatic visits by heads of state